Ángela Azul Concepción Caccia (born 13 August 1998 in Avellaneda, Province of Buenos Aires, Argentina), known as Ángela Torres, is an Argentinian actress and singer. She is the daughter of the actress Gloria Carrá and of the musician Marcelo Torres, niece of the popular singer Diego Torres and granddaughter of the deceased Lolita Torres. She has also taken part in several musical comedies such as "The Sound of Music" and "Peter Pan".

Career 
In 2008 she made her television debut in the series Patito Feo, produced by the Argentinian company Ideas del Sur and starring Juan Darthés and Griselda Siciliani. She featured in six episodes of the series, which was carried by the channel El Trece.

In April 2012 she appeared in the Argentine film Extraños en la noche starring her uncle, Diego Torres. In May 2012 she appeared in her first major television role, playing Paloma Cocker in the series Condicionados, and her performance earned her a nomination for the Tato Awards.

En 2015, elle a joué le rôle de Lola Fiore dans la série Esperanza Mia . C'était pour elle la deuxième fois qu’elle jouait avec Lali Esposito,  les deux étoiles avaient déjà joué ensemble dans la série Solamente Vos: Daniela Cousteau (Lali Esposito), Mora Cousteau (Angela Torres).

Personal life 
Ángela Torres is closely related to several famous artists. Her mother is Gloria Carrá, her father is Marcelo Torres, her uncle is Diego Torres, and her grandmother is Lolita Torres. Growing up in this family influenced her to begin studying theater at eight years old.

Television

Movies

Theater

Discography

Soundtracks

Live albums

Extended plays

Singles

As lead artist

As featured artist

Promotional singles

Other appearances

Footnotes

References 

Argentine film actresses
Argentine stage actresses
Argentine television actresses
Argentine child actresses
Argentine people of Spanish descent
People from Avellaneda
21st-century Argentine women singers
1998 births
Living people
Participants in Argentine reality television series
Bailando por un Sueño (Argentine TV series) participants